Zebrasoma xanthurum, the purple tang or yellowtail tang, is a species of reef surgeonfish in the family Acanthuridae. It was first described by zoologist Edward Blyth in 1852.

Description
Purple tangs grow to a maximum length of near . Their bodies are purple in color with a yellow tail. The heads of purple tangs are covered with black spots, and black horizontal lines run down the sides of the bodies of some specimens. The center of their bodies are sometimes a darker color of purple relative to the rest of their bodies. On most specimens, the tips of their pectoral fins are yellow.

Like all members of the genus Zebrasoma, purple tangs have large dorsal and anal fins and an extended snout that is used to forage for algae within rocks. When the dorsal and anal fins are fully extended, the fish looks like a disk.

As typical of all surgeonfish, purple tangs have a sharp spines on each side of their caudal peduncle, which are used for defense.

Distribution
Purple tangs were originally found in the Red Sea. They are now found in the Gulf of Aden, Persian Gulf, the Arabian Sea and recently (2015) for the first time in the Mediterranean Sea near Sardinia.

Habitat
Purple tangs typically inhabit coral reef ecosystems, where they are found eating filamentous algae in the reef. Adults are typically found swimming in shoals, while juveniles remain solitary.

References

External links
 Purple tang (Zebrasoma xanthurus)
 

Acanthuridae
Fish described in 1852
Taxa named by Edward Blyth